The Tribeca Film Institute (TFI) is a year-round non-profit arts organization founded by Robert De Niro, Jane Rosenthal, and Craig Hatkoff, based in New York.

The Tribeca Film Institute was created in 2003 in the wake of September 11, 2001. TFI targets filmmakers from "systemically excluded communities", and awards them funding, professional development or mentorship, to allow them to further or begin their careers in film.

As of September 2020, TFI suspended operations due to "uncertainties surrounding our new reality", regarding the COVID-19 pandemic.

Youth programming

TFI is the City of New York Department of Education's partner for the filmmaking component of the DOE's Summer Arts Institute. TFI served as the primary cultural partner to develop the DOE's Blueprint for the Teaching and Learning of the Moving Image. Released in October 2009, the Blueprint is a curriculum guide for the study of film, television, and animation from grades K – 12 and sets benchmarks for a citywide standard for teaching media arts.

TFI's youth programs include Tribeca Teaches: Films in Motion, an in-school and after-school filmmaking residency; the Tribeca Youth Screening Series, a year-round program that provides students and teachers with access to relevant films and helps integrate film into the classroom curricula; Tribeca Film Fellows, a pre-professional development program that brings twenty NYC high-school students behind-the-scenes of the Tribeca Film Festival; the Summer Arts Institute; and Our City, My Story, an annual showcase of youth-made films.

Board of directors

The Tribeca Film Institute Board of Directors is composed of Robert De Niro, Co-chair, Jane Rosenthal, Co-chair, Alberta Arthurs, Vice Chair, Serena Altschul, Martin Edelman, Eli Evans, Craig Hatkoff, Lisa Hsia, Jennifer Maguire Isham, Sheila Nevins, Norman Pearlstine, Sam Pollard, Laurie Racine, Scott Rechler, John G. Roche, Martin Scorsese, Judy Tabb, Jonathan Tisch, Todd Wagner, and Jeffrey Wright.

References

Non-profit organizations based in New York City
Film organizations in the United States
Organizations based in New York City
Robert De Niro